This is a list of current high definition channels that are available in Ireland, those coming in the future and those that have ceased broadcasting.

All HD channels in Ireland broadcast at 1080i.

There are currently two channels available to Saorsat viewers, three channels available to Saorview viewers, one-hundred-and-ten channels available to Sky Ireland viewers and sixty-three channels available to Virgin Media Ireland viewers on their respective EPGs.

HD channels

See also
List of HD channels in the United Kingdom

Notes

References

External links

HD channels
HD channels
HD channels in the Republic of Ireland
Ireland channels
Ireland